Hopson Development Holdings Limited or Hopson Development, established in Guangzhou, China in 1992, is one of the five largest real estate private companies in Guangdong Province. (The others are Country Garden, Evergrande Real Estate Group, R&F Properties and Agile Property.) It focuses on property developments, including residential property, commercial property, hotel and tourist property, and property management business, in major Mainland cities such as Guangzhou, Beijing, Tianjin and Shanghai.

It was listed on the Hong Kong Stock Exchange in 1998.

Its headquarters are in Chaoyang District, Beijing. Its headquarters were previously in Zhujiang New Town, Guangzhou.

On October 4, 2021, during the Evergrande liquidity crisis, the Cailian Press reported that Hopson Development was set to buy a 51% stake in Evergrande for around 5 billion United States dollars. However, by October 20th, The Guardian reported that this value was decreased to 2.6 billion dollars, and that activity surrounding such deal with suspended following objection by the Guangdong provincial government, which is overseeing Evergrande's restructuring.

See also
Real estate in China

References

External links
Hopson Development Holdings Limited 

Companies listed on the Hong Kong Stock Exchange
Real estate companies of China
Privately held companies of China
Companies based in Guangzhou
Real estate companies established in 1992
Chinese companies established in 1992